is a Japanese politician of the Liberal Democratic Party, a member of the House of Representatives in the Diet (national legislature).

Overviews 
A native of Yokohama, Kanagawa and graduate of Rikkyo University, he was elected to the city assembly of Yokohama for the first time in 1999 and to the House of Representatives for the first time in 2005.

References

External links 
 Official website in Japanese.

Living people
1964 births
People from Yokohama
Koizumi Children
Members of the House of Representatives (Japan)
Liberal Democratic Party (Japan) politicians
Rikkyo University alumni